The Minister of Women in the Presidency is the minister of the South African government with political responsibility for South Africa's Department of Women within the  presidency of South Africa. The current Minister is Nkosazana Dlamini-Zuma, who was appointed by President Cyril Ramaphosa on 6 March 2023.

List of Past Ministers

Minister of Women in the Presidency, 2014–2019

Minister of Women, Youth and Persons with Disabilities, 2019–present

References

External links
Department of Women

Lists of political office-holders in South Africa